Obomkpa is an Igbo town in the Aniocha North local government area of Delta State, Nigeria.

History
Obomkpa community was founded by Anagba some centuries ago and situated within the geographical coordinates of 6°24′55″N 6°29′29″E/6.41528°N 6.49139°E which consist of the following major Quarters namely; Ogbe-Obi, Ogbe-Onei and Ukpatu respectively. It is one of the communities that make up the Umu-Ezechima clan.

At present, Obomkpa is an important community in the Aniocha North Local Government Area of Delta State. It is bounded in the South by Ubulubu town, in the North by Idumuogo town, in the East by Ukwunzu town, in the West by Ugboba town, in the Northwest by Onicha-Olona and in the Southeast by Ezi town etc.

Obomkpa community operates a Monarchical Type of Government, which is headed by His Royal Majesty (The Obi), followed by the Obi in Council, Council of Chiefs, Red Cap Chiefs, Heads of Villages and Head of quarters. The Kingship is based on the system of Primogeniture i.e.  From Father to Son (Eze-Ada).

The major occupations of the people in Obomkpa are Farming, Hunting and Petty Trading. The community has produced Sons and Daughters who has excelled in Various fields of human endeavors and are based in Different parts of the country and in Diaspora.

Geography

Rivers
 Iyi-Nkpukpa
 Iyi-Odo
 Iyi-Nem-agdi
 Iyi-ilo
 Iyi-nta
 Iyi Ako
 Iyi-Ocha
 Owuwu
 Iyi Okwu-suno
 Oji-Okpa

Food 
Obomkpa is traditionally known to have the following types of food:

 Nni-ji (Pounded yam)
 Nni-akpu (Fufu)
 Ofe Ujuju
 Ofe Nsala
 Ofe Aku (Ofe Ose, Banga soup)
 Ose-Okwa
 Ofe Uliome
 Ofe Agbono
 Ofe Egusi
 Ofe mkpakwo (Vegetable soup)
 Akpaka
 Ukpoka

Names of the Obis from past to present 
 Obi Anagba (1598 – 1630, 42 years)
 Obi Ado (1630 – 1675, 45 years)
 Obi Onalo (1675 – 1715, 40 years)
 Obi Ngwuogiliga (1715 – 1745, 30 years)
 Obi Obome (1745 – 1770, 25 years)
 Obi Uya (1770 – 1804, 34 years)
 Obi Usifo (1804 – 1863, 59 years)
 Obi Dibie (1863 – 1903, 40 years)
 Obi Chidi (1903 – 1943, 40 years)
 Obi Nsuebo (1943 – 1955, 12 years)
 Obi Ezeka (1955 – 2006, 52 years)
 Obi Jonathan (2006 – 2017, 11 years)
 Obi Onyemaechi Josiah Kanyinaga I (2017 – present)

Major features of the community

Government-owned establishments 
 Obomkpa (Mixed) Secondary School
 Anagba Primary School, Obomkpa
 Ofunne Primary School, Obomkpa
 Primary Health Centre, Obomkpa
 Post Office
 Obi's Punch

Community establishments 
 Obi's Palace
 Obomkpa Youths Vocational centre

Festivals 
 Egwu-Afa
 Ine/Idu-Olu
 Iti-Ubi
 Iwa-ji (New Yam Festival)

Religion

Churches 
 Sacred Heart Catholic Church
 ST. Stephen Anglican Church
 Baptists Church
 Cherubim And Seraphim Church
 Jehovah Witness
 Pure Gold Int’l Ministry
 Living Word Gospel Mission
 Redeem Christian Church of God (RCCG)
 Living Faith (Winners)
 Mountain of Fire Ministry (etc.)

Gods 
 Iwu Anagba
 Obunebu
 Iwu- Afa
 Iwu-Ani Ogbe-Onei
 Ajo- Ofia

Obomkpa Market Days
Obomkpa lists of the market Days are Nkwo, Olie, Eke and Afor. Obomkpa main market day is Eke. The town main market is held on Eke days, a fourth day of the traditional week, after Olie, Afor, and Nkwo. Obomkpa market is a main spot for wholesale of garri, mostly to buyers from the Southern and Eastern Nigeria. Other products usually on sales at the Eke market are plantain, banana, fruits, vegetables, yam and corn.

The Administration Of The Community
A. The community is governed through the following organs

The Obi (His Royal Majesty)
The Obi in Council
The Council of Chiefs
The Red Cap Chiefs/Elders
The village Quarters and Kindred leadership & follower-ship
The Obomkpa Progressive Union ( Federated/ Branches & Zones)
B. Various Association And pressure Groups

Obomkpa Action Congress (OAC)
The Great Pioneers Of Obomkpa (GPO)
Obomkpa First Foundation (OFFO)
Progress Lovers Of Obomkpa (PROLLO)
Obomkpa Development Foundation (ODF)
The Composition of Obomkpa Council of Chiefs
Iyase
Odogwu
Isama
Oza
Omu
Uwolor
Isagba
Ozoma
Ogwuluzeme
Onu Obi
Ogbele Ani
Odafe
Okaome
OdoziObodo
Ugo Obi
Nwata Kwacha Aka
Onwanetinyeora (Onwa)
Olikeze
Azuneyi
Inwegwe
Anyanwu
Ike Obi
Ojiso
ObeleAgwu
Nti Obi
Aje
Onyido
Oboli
EkikeFulueze
Owele
Ada Dioranma (Ada Ora)
NwokeDioranma (NnaDia)
Isimili
Odume
Ede
Oputa Obie
Awo
Anya Obi
Ihaze
Elibo
Ogbuehi
Major Mineral Deposit In Obomkpa
Obomkpa community is blessed with a Mineral deposit which is mainly Coal Lignite and in focus currently under Exploration.

Security Apparatus
Considering the current  Insecurity challenges and the need for community Policing, Obomkpa Community hereby has the following as her Security Apparatus such as;

I. Obomkpa Vigilante Group.

II. Anioma Vigilante Group.

III. Nigeria Police Force (Police Post still in view).

References
Edited by Okafor Augustine Ikeoliseh...... Source: www.obomkpayouths.org 

Populated places in Delta State